Rao Qaiser Ali Khan is a Pakistani politician.
He was elected MNA from NA-112, Okara in 1990, 1993 and 1997 elections. In 1990, he defeated Pakistani People's Party's Rao Muhammad Afzal Khan.
In 1993, Rao Qaiser won this seat on the PML-N ticket with 55,132 votes over PPP candidate Rao Afzal with 42,680 votes. In 1997 elections, Rao Qaiser defeated PML-J's Manzoor Wattoo, 46,697 votes to 26,449 votes.

References

External links
Rao Qaiser formally joins PPP
PML-N Okara leader joins PPP
Rao Qaiser Ali Khan calls on Prime Minister

Year of birth missing (living people)
Punjabi people
Living people